Mok Chun Wah (also transliterated as Mok Chun Wa, born 5 May 1929) is a former professional footballer. Born in British Hong Kong to ethnic Chinese parents, Mok represented the Republic of China (Taiwan) and spending his whole professional career in the Hong Kong leagues.

Early life 
On May 5, 1929, Mok was born in Hong Kong.

Club career
Mok was with Yiu Cheuk Yin and Ho Cheng Yau one of the "Three Aces" that formed the strikeforce of South China Athletic Association in the 1950s and 1960s.

International career
He was part of the Republic of China (Taiwan) team that won the gold medals at the 1954 and 1958 Asian Games. He scored a goal in the 1960 Olympics.

Mok also represented Hong Kong Chinese in a non-FIFA recognized match against Malayan Chinese in 1959 Ho Ho Cup; in 1957, Mok also represented Hong Kong League XI in Merdeka Tournament, a friendly tournament; the team was almost entirely composed of the players of Eastern Sports Club, which was playing friendlies in the Asia-Pacific. However, Mok was the only player to fly directly from Hong Kong as a non-Eastern player. That representative team, was in fact composed for 9 Hong Kong footballers that chose to represent Republic of China (Taiwan). Mok was also selected to the 1961 edition as a member of Hong Kong League XI.

Honours

Republic of China
Asian Games Gold medal: 1954, 1958

References

External links
 
 

1929 births
Living people
Hong Kong footballers
Taiwanese footballers
South China AA players
Hong Kong First Division League players
Footballers at the 1960 Summer Olympics
Footballers at the 1954 Asian Games
Footballers at the 1958 Asian Games
Medalists at the 1954 Asian Games
Medalists at the 1958 Asian Games
Asian Games gold medalists for Chinese Taipei
Olympic footballers of Taiwan
Chinese Taipei international footballers
Chinese Taipei international footballers from Hong Kong
Asian Games medalists in football
Association football forwards